The Jerusalem Botanical Gardens (JBG), originally planned as successor to the National Botanic Garden of Israel on Mount Scopus which, nevertheless, still exists as a separate entity, is located in the neighborhood of Nayot in Jerusalem, on the southeastern edge of the Givat Ram campus of the Hebrew University of Jerusalem.
The garden is arranged in phytogeographic sections, featuring flora of various regions around the world. The Jerusalem Botanical Gardens opened to the public in 1985. The tropical conservatory opened in 1986 and the South Africa section was planted in 1989. The Hank Greenspan Entrance Plaza, Dvorsky Visitors’ Center and restaurant were built in 1990.

History
Plans for the first National Botanic Garden of Israel, on a plot of land purchased on Mount Scopus in 1926, were drawn up by Alexander Eig, chairman of the Botany Department of the Hebrew University, based on the flora of the Land of Israel from Mount Lebanon to the desert. Planting began in 1931. The botanical gardens on Mount Scopus were the first home of the  Biblical Zoo.

In 1948, in the 1947–1949 Palestine war, access to Mount Scopus and the university campus was cut off from the rest of Israel, and it was decided to create a new Botanical Garden (the subject of this entry) near the Jewish National and University Library, on the new campus of the Hebrew University in Givat Ram in western Jerusalem. The new Botanical Garden, including a unique collection of Coniferae, was opened in 1954, soon after the establishment of Givat Ram campus. In 1962, a rocky hill in the southeastern corner of the campus was planted with conifers from North America. That year, Michael Avishai was appointed scientific director of the gardens. Many of the trees were raised from his private seed collection.

Budgeting was a serious problem until 1975, when the Society of Friends of the Botanical Gardens was established and the garden became a joint project of the university, the Jerusalem Municipality and the Jewish National Fund. A scientific board was appointed, and architect Shlomo Aronson was commissioned to plan the layout. In 1981, the Garden Association was founded, and a board of executives appointed. The garden was opened to the public in 1985. In 1994, it separated from the Hebrew University, and has been managed by the Botanical Garden Association since 1996.

Bonsai
The garden's Japanese section contains over 150 bonsai trees, the largest concentrated collection of bonsai trees in the world.

Birds
Birdwatchers have identified 46 species of birds that visit the Gardens throughout the year.

Bible path
The 500-meter long "Bible Path" is planted with most of the 70 species that scientists have identified as some of the 400 types of plants mentioned in the Bible.

Endangered species
One of the goals of the garden is to create a living gene bank to protect endangered plants in Israel and the region as a whole.

See also
List of botanical gardens in Israel
National Botanic Garden of Israel
Wildlife of Israel
Tourism in Israel

References

External links
Official website of the botanical garden in Givat Ram
Official website of the botanical garden in Mount Scopus
Jerusalem Botanical Garden blossoms with flora
JBG Pictures

Botanical gardens in Israel
Buildings and structures in Jerusalem
Education in Jerusalem
Tourist attractions in Jerusalem
Bible-themed museums, zoos, and botanical gardens
Hebrew Bible in popular culture